The 1939 Akron Zippers football team was an American football team that represented the University of Akron as an independent during the 1939 college football season. In its first season under head coach Thomas Dowler, the team compiled a 5–4 record and was outscored by a total of 132 to 122. Dominic Patella was the team captain.

Schedule

References

Akron
Akron Zips football seasons
Akron Zippers football